A primary dealer is a firm that buys government securities directly from a government, with the intention of reselling them to others, thus acting as a market maker of government securities. The government may regulate the behaviour and number of its primary dealers and impose conditions of entry. Some governments sell their securities only to primary dealers; some sell them to others as well. Governments that use primary dealers include Australia, Belgium, Brazil, Canada, China, France, Hong Kong, India, Italy, Japan, Singapore, Spain, Sweden, the United Kingdom, Pakistan and the United States.

Primary dealers in the United States
In the United States, a primary dealer is a bank or securities broker-dealer that is permitted to trade directly with the Federal Reserve System ("the Fed"). Such firms are required to make bids or offers when the Fed conducts open market operations, provide information to the Fed's open market trading desk, and to participate actively in U.S. Treasury securities auctions. They consult with both the U.S. Treasury and the Fed about funding the budget deficit and implementing monetary policy. Many former employees of primary dealers work at the Treasury because of their expertise in the government debt markets, though the Fed avoids a similar revolving door policy.
 
The relationship between the Fed and the primary dealers is governed by the Primary Dealers Act of 1988 and the Fed's operating policy "Administration of Relationships with Primary Dealers."
Primary dealers purchase the vast majority of the U.S. Treasury securities (T-bills, T-notes, and T-bonds) sold at auction, and resell them to the public. Their activities extend well beyond the Treasury market. For example, according to the Wall Street Journal Europe (2/9/06 p. 20), all of the top ten dealers in the foreign exchange market are also primary dealers, and between them account for almost 73% of foreign exchange trading volume. Arguably, this group's members are the most influential and powerful non-governmental institutions in global financial markets.  Group membership changes slowly, with the current list available from the New York Fed.
 
The primary dealers form a worldwide network that distributes new U.S. government debt. For example, Daiwa Securities and Mizuho Securities distribute the debt to Japanese buyers. BNP Paribas, Barclays, Deutsche Bank and NatWest Group distribute the debt to European buyers. Goldman Sachs, and Citigroup account for many American buyers. Nevertheless, most of these firms compete internationally and in all major financial centers.

In response to the subprime mortgage crisis and to the collapse of Bear Stearns, on March 19, 2008, the Federal Reserve set up the Primary Dealers Credit Facility (PDCF), whereby primary dealers could borrow at the Fed's discount window using several forms of collateral including mortgage-backed loans. The PDCF was closed on February 1, 2010.

History
The current system of primary dealers was set up in 1960 with 18 dealers. The number of primary dealers grew to 46 in 1988, declined to 21 by 2007 and stands at 24 in July 2019.
 
The most recent addition to the list of primary dealers was Amherst Pierpont Securities LLC on May 6, 2019. The last previous addition was Wells Fargo Securities LLC on April 18, 2016. Name changes of the firms are fairly common as are withdrawals due to mergers; for example, when Merrill Lynch was taken over by Bank of America, the Merrill Lynch name was at first withdrawn but the Bank of America dealer firm was later renamed Merrill Lynch.

Current primary dealers with the Federal Reserve Bank of New York
As of May 6, 2019, according to the Federal Reserve Bank of New York the list includes:
 Amherst Pierpont Securities LLC
 Bank of Nova Scotia, New York Agency
 BMO Capital Markets Corp.
 BNP Paribas Securities Corp.
 Barclays Capital Inc.
 BofA Securities
 Cantor Fitzgerald & Co.
 Citigroup Global Markets Inc.
 Credit Suisse AG, New York Branch
 Daiwa Capital Markets America Inc.
 Deutsche Bank Securities Inc.
 Goldman Sachs & Co. LLC
 HSBC Securities (USA) Inc.
 Jefferies LLC
 J.P. Morgan Securities LLC
 Mizuho Securities USA LLC
 Morgan Stanley & Co. LLC
 NatWest Markets Securities Inc.
 Nomura Securities International, Inc.
 RBC Capital Markets, LLC
 Societe Generale, New York Branch
 TD Securities (USA) LLC
 UBS Securities LLC.
 Wells Fargo Securities LLC.

References

External links
NY Federal Reserve - Primary Dealers

 
Federal Reserve System